Denis Valentinovich Manturov (born 23 February 1969) is a Russian politician who has served as Deputy Prime Minister since July 2022, and Minister of Trade and Industry of the Russian Federation since 2012. He was first appointed as acting minister to replace Viktor Khristenko, who resigned from the office.

Biography

Education
1994 – Graduated from State Moscow University in Sociology.
2006 – Graduated from Russian State Academy for State Service under the President of Russia
Since 2011 – Professor for Management Systems of Economic objects in Moscow Aviation Institute.

Career
1998–2000 – Deputy Director General of Ulan-Ude Aviation Plant.
2000–2001 – Commercial Director of The Mil Moscow Helicopters Plant.
2001–2003 – Deputy Chairman of Federal State Investments Corporation.
2003–2007 – Director General of United Industry Corporation, Oboronprom.
2007–2008 – Deputy Minister of Industry and Energy of the Russian Federation.
2008 – Deputy Minister of Industry and Trade of Russia.
2012 – present – Manturov was appointed as acting Minister of Industry and Trade, his appointment was re-approved on May 21, 2012, in ministerial office as Minister of Industry and Trade in Dmitry Medvedev's Cabinet.
2022–present – Deputy Prime Minister.

Directorships
On 30 July 2015 the United Aircraft Corporation of Russia named Manturov to its board of directors.

Controversy
In January 2023, Manturov received a dressing down from Russian President Vladimir Putin for not expediting the contracting of new aircraft, during a televised meeting with members of the Russian Cabinet. Manturov said he would try to make sure it’s done during the first quarter; Putin, visibly angry, said, “You don’t try to do all you can, you do it within a month, no later than that.”

Family
He is currently married to his wife Natalia, of whom he has two children with (the oldest being Leonela and the youngest being Yevgeny). Leonela is currently a member of the Faculty of Sociology at Moscow State University. Manturov's father Valentin, has owned 50% of a financial company since November 2017, according to SPARK-Interfax.

Lobbying interests 
Manturov called for the transfer of natural monuments Yuraktau, Kushtau and Toratau to the Bashkir soda company.

Awards
 Order of Friendship
 Order of Honour
Order of the Star of Italy (revoked)

References

External links
Official Biography, in Official Website of the Ministry of Industry
Information from ITAR-TASS, Information Telegraph Agency of Russia

1969 births
Living people
1st class Active State Councillors of the Russian Federation
People from Murmansk
Government ministers of Russia
Moscow State University alumni
21st-century Russian politicians